The 1939 East Norfolk by-election was a parliamentary by-election held on 26 January 1939 for the British House of Commons constituency of East Norfolk.

Previous MP 
The seat had become vacant on 14 November 1938, when the constituency's National Liberal Member of Parliament (MP), William Lygon, Viscount Elmley had succeeded to the peerage as the 8th Earl Beauchamp. He had been East Norfolk's MP since he was first elected as a Liberal at the 1929 general election, when he gained the seat from the Conservatives. He joined the breakaway National Liberals in 1931, and at the following General election was not opposed by the Conservatives.

Previous result

Candidates 
Only two candidates contested the by-election: Frank Medlicott for the National Liberals, and Norman Tillett for the Labour Party. Medlicott was a 36-year-old London solicitor who had not contested an election since standing for the Liberal party at Acton in 1929. Tillett was a Norwich solicitor, whose great-grandfather and uncle were both Liberal MPs for Norwich. Tillett had fought the seat at the last General Election.
A number of local Conservatives who were unhappy about supporting Medlicott tried to get an Independent Conservative candidate to stand. For a while, it seemed as if James F. Wright, the Secretary of the Norfolk Farmers Union would run as an Independent Conservative, but by close of nominations, there were just the two candidates.

Result 
Medlicott held the seat for the National Liberals, with a reduced but still substantial majority.

Aftermath 
The 1945 general election was again a two-way contest between Medlicott and Tilett, and Medlicott held the seat.

When the East Norfolk constituency was abolished for the 1950 general election, he was returned for the new Central Norfolk seat.

See also
 East Norfolk constituency
 Norfolk
 Lists of United Kingdom by-elections
 United Kingdom by-election records

References
 
 

 

1939 elections in the United Kingdom
1939 in England
East
20th century in Norfolk